Theodore Boone is a fictional character created by John Grisham, who is the title character in Grisham's legal series for children. As of 2019, Boone has appeared in seven books.

Boone is a kind, independent 13-year-old student who resides in the medium-sized city of Strattenburg, Pennsylvania, with his parents: Woods Boone, a real estate lawyer, and Marcella Boone, a divorce attorney. Theo dreams of following in their footsteps one day, becoming either a lawyer or judge. Thanks to his parents' work, Theo knows a great deal about the law and knows many police officers and judges in the city.  He often helps his classmates solve issues they are having.

Books 
Boone appears in the following novels, published by Grosset & Dunlap.

References

External links 
 

Fictional amateur detectives
Fictional characters from Pennsylvania
Literary characters introduced in 2010
Teenage characters in literature